James Cecil "Jay" Adams Jr. (born 1949) is a  Republican member of the North Carolina House of Representatives. He has represented the 96th district (including constituents in Catawba County) since 2015.

Life and career
Adams earned his Bachelor of Science in education from The Citadel. He studied mechanical drawing, computer science and real estate at Catawba Valley Community College and earned his real estate license in 1983. He has lived in Hickory, North Carolina, since 1975.

Electoral history

2020

2018

2016

2014

Committee assignments

2021-2022 session
Appropriations
Appropriations - Education
Wildlife Resources (Chair)
Judiciary IV (Vice Chair)
Commerce and Job Development
Education - Community College
Local Government - Land Use, Planning and Development
Transportation

2019-2020 session
Appropriations
Appropriations - Education
Wildlife Resources (Chair)
Judiciary
Commerce and Job Development
Education - Community Colleges
Election Law and Campaign Finance Reform

2017-2018 session
Wildlife Resources (Chair)
Environment (Vice Chair)
Commerce and Job Development
Elections and Ethics Law
Finance
Transportation
State and Local Government II

2015-2016 session
Environment (Vice Chair)
Wildlife Resources
Commerce and Job Development
Finance
Judiciary IV
Transportation
Children, Youth and Families

References

Living people
1949 births
Place of birth missing (living people)
People from Hickory, North Carolina
The Citadel, The Military College of South Carolina alumni
21st-century American politicians
Republican Party members of the North Carolina House of Representatives